Waverly is a city in Wright County, Minnesota, United States. The population was 1,357 at the 2010 census.

History
The framework for the City of Waverly began in 1855, when the territorial legislature passed an act organizing Wright County. A survey team was sent out shortly after by the government to plot the new county's divisions. These surveyors were greeted by established homesteaders who had already begun clearing the land and planting crops. Prior to European settlement, Waverly was predominantly Big Woods which included a mixture of oak, maple, basswood and hickory. Small portions of wet prairie existed on the eastern edge of Waverly Lake and along the western edge of present-day CSAH 8.

Impressed with the two lakes (Waverly and Little Waverly), available water power and the proximity of the Crow River one mile north, an entrepreneurial surveyor and his partners constructed a dam, saw mill and grist mill in 1856 at the outlet of Little Waverly Lake.   The settlement known as Waverly Mills was beginning to take shape, as approximately three hundred acres were surveyed and platted.  Waverly Mills was given its name after a community in Tioga County, New York, the former home of one of the partners.   After a rough start with a bank panic, financial crash and subsequent grasshopper infestations, Waverly Mills managed to survive.   Its saw and grist milling industry help to establish a store, post office and log church with a cemetery at this location.

The village was formerly called Waverly Station to distinguish it from Old Waverly, a pioneer village which in the early days flourished about a mile away. Waverly Station was laid out by the railroad company on their land in the southwest quarter of section 33, at about the time that regular trains commenced operating in this locality in 1868. A railroad station was erected that year, and a grain house the next. The first store was opened by T. R. Barrett, who operated it for a few years, and then changed it to a hotel under the name of the Keystone House.

Among the lodges in the early 1900s were the Knights of Columbus, the Catholic Order of Foresters, the Modern Woodmen of America, the Modern Brotherhood of America, the Ancient Order of United Workmen, the Royal Neighbors of America, and others.

The school which once stood where the current Humphrey Elementary School now stands was built in 1905 and was composed of a brick structure, two stories high, with a basement; and run by four teachers. In addition to a complete course, the school taught manual training and music.

Waverly Station was incorporated as a village in 1881; the village was reincorporated as Waverly in 1885. The following notation appears in the county records: "March 16, 1885. A special election called by the trustees of the village of Waverly for the purpose of ascertaining by ballot whether the village of Waverly should continue as the incorporated under a special act of the legislature or become reincorporated under the General Statute of Minnesota, was held on Monday, March 16, 1885. Due notice of said election having been given and the object of said election having been fully set forth in notices, polls opened at 10 a. m. and closed at 4 p. m. Number of votes polled, 41 ; for reincorporation, 41 ; against, none. The village of Waverly was therefore declared reincorporated under the General Statutes of Minnesota and same recorded in the village records.

The prosperity of Waverly in those early days was aided by both railroad traffic and by patronage of the surrounding settlers in Woodland and Marysville Townships.  Many of these early farmers hailed from various parts of the United States, French Canada and European countries specifically from Sweden, Ireland, Germany, Prussia, Austria and Switzerland.  These pioneers supported Waverly's many institutions which included a post office, bank, newspapers, city hall, churches, creamery, school, grain elevators, flouring mills, saw mill, insurance agencies, hotels, livery stables, general stores, hardware dealers, furniture shops, lumber companies, bakery, meat markets, millinery shops, saloons and a drugstore to name just a few.

Waverly moved faster and progressed farther in 30 years than some of its rival communities. Some claim that Waverly's businesses and buildings were some of the largest and finest in Wright County at their height of development.   One historical account stated that Waverly, "is a pleasant, prosperous village, located on one of the very pleasant lakes; it is quite a summer resort for pleasure seekers...."   Records indicate that by 1909, the population of Waverly had expanded to over 1,000 residents.

Since its incorporation, Waverly has changed both physically and demographically. Like many similar rural communities of greater Minnesota, Waverly has felt the documented socio-economic effects of industrialized agriculture, rural exodus of young residents to regional urban cores and aging population. Waverly hosted some small development in the 1930s and 40s and a small subdivision in the early 1960s. But by 1980, Waverly's population had decreased to 470 persons. Direct results of this rural trend were merging, consolidating or vanishing institutions and businesses.

Academic researchers have indicated that small communities like Waverly are entering a period of transition and metamorphosis. The grain elevators that once identified Waverly are gone, and new residential housing developments have appeared. The Twin Cities Metropolitan Area that once seemed distant is now only a 40-minute car drive away.

From 2000 to 2007, Waverly attracted the attention of residential developers in a flurry. The large influx of new residents during this short time beckoned back to Waverly's historical boom period prior to 1900. This time  however, the growth was primarily housing. Several developments were platted, including Summerfields, Woodland Shores, Spring Meadows, Carrigan Meadows, Carrigan Estates and Windgate at Carrigan Lake. The population has increased by over 60 percent since 2000 to nearly 1,300 in 2010 after many decades of static to no growth.  Waverly is now poised for future growth while continuing to maintain its small-town appeal.

The Waverly Village Hall, built in 1939, is listed on the National Register of Historic Places.

Geography

U.S. Highway 12 serves as a main route in the community.

Demographics

As of the census of 2010, there were 1,357 people, 520 households, and 357 families residing in the city. The racial makeup of the city was 97.3% White, 0.5% African American, 0.4% Native American, 0.8% Asian, 0.1% from other races, and 1.0% from two or more races. Hispanic or Latino of any race were 1.3% of the population.

There were 520 households, of which 37.1% had children under the age of 18 living with them, 56.2% were married couples living together, 7.1% had a female householder with no husband present, 5.4% had a male householder with no wife present, and 31.3% were non-families. 24.0% of all households were made up of individuals, and 6.1% had someone living alone who was 65 years of age or older. The average household size was 2.53 and the average family size was 3.03.

The median age in the city was 31.6 years. 26.6% of residents were under the age of 18; 7.6% were between the ages of 18 and 24; 37.6% were from 25 to 44; 20.1% were from 45 to 64; and 8.2% were 65 years of age or older. The gender makeup of the city was 53.7% male and 46.3% female.

Politics

Notable people
Dick Borrell, Minnesota state representative, educator, and businessman
William Culkin, Minnesota state senator and historian.
Hubert Humphrey (1911–1978), American politician who served as the 38th Vice President of the United States from 1965 to 1969. Humphrey twice served as a U.S. senator, representing Minnesota from 1949 to 1964 and 1971 to 1978. In 1958 Humphrey and his wife Muriel built a lakefront home in Waverly; it served as his primary residence for the rest of his life, and he died there in 1978. Waverly's elementary school is named after Vice President Humphrey.
Reuben Soderstrom (1888–1970), American labor leader who served as president of the Illinois State Federation of Labor and Illinois AFL-CIO from 1930 to 1970. Soderstrom was born to Swedish immigrants on a small farm west of Waverly.

References

External links

 City Website

Cities in Wright County, Minnesota
Cities in Minnesota